The United States Army Intelligence Agency was a military intelligence unit with the U.S. Department of the Army created in 1967. In 1977, it was replaced by the United States Army Intelligence and Security Command.

Commands of the United States Army